Geoffrey Macadam Foot (19 May 1915 – 9 September 2010) was a British film editor. He was born in Putney and began his career with Ealing Studios. Foot was a co-founder of the Guild of British Film and Television Editors.

Selected filmography
 The Passionate Friends (1949)
 Madeleine (1950)
 The Galloping Major (1951)
 The Sound Barrier (1952)
 Rob Roy, the Highland Rogue (1953)
 Trouble in Store (1953)
 Fortune Is a Woman (1957)
 Blue Murder at St Trinian's (1957)
 The Trials of Oscar Wilde (1960)
 The Long Ships (1964)
 Genghis Khan (1965)
 Death Line (1972)
 The Watcher in the Woods (1980)

References

External links
 

British film editors
1915 births
2010 deaths
People from Putney
English television editors